The 1922 Delaware Fightin' Blue Hens football team was an American football team that represented the University of Delaware in the 1922 college football season. In their first season under head coach William McAvoy, the Blue Hens compiled a 5–3–1 record and were outscored by a total of 84 to 42. The team played its home games at Frazer Field in Newark, Delaware.

Schedule

References

Delaware
Delaware Fightin' Blue Hens football seasons
Delaware Fightin' Blue Hens football